Bence Banó-Szabó (born 25 July 1999) is a Hungarian football player who plays for Kecskemét.

Career

Budapest Honvéd
On 26 August 2017, Banó-Szabó played his first match for Budapest Honvéd in a 1-3 loss against Debrecen in the Hungarian League.

Kecskemét
In July 2022, Banó-Szabó returned to his former youth club Kecskemét.

Club statistics

Updated to games played as of 15 May 2022.

References

External links
 
 
 Profile at HLSZ 

1999 births
People from Kecskemét
Sportspeople from Bács-Kiskun County
Living people
Hungarian footballers
Hungary youth international footballers
Hungary under-21 international footballers
Association football midfielders
Budapest Honvéd FC players
Budapest Honvéd FC II players
Kecskeméti TE players
Nemzeti Bajnokság I players